Trey Traviesa was a Republican Florida State Representative serving Florida district 56, in the Tampa area. He received his BS in Finance from Florida State University and his MBA from the University of Texas at Austin.

Traviesa grew up in the Tampa area with his parents and his sister. His mother was a public school teacher for 34 years and his father worked in juvenile justice. He was student body president at FSU.

He was elected to the Florida House of Representatives in 2004 in a six-way primary. He has worked aggressively for education reform, growth management, and cable franchise reform, among other issues. He is married to Nina Traviesa, who was appointed in 2006 to the Governor's Commission on Volunteerism and Community Service, Volunteer Florida, by Governor Jeb Bush. They have two daughters, Alexa and Amelia. He now resides in Tampa and owns Asturias Management Corporation, a private equity investment firm   He is also an officer in the U.S. Navy.

On August 12, 2008, Representative Traviesa announced that he would not run for reelection. His reasons were that this position took too much time away from his Family and business. His legislative aid 26-year-old Rachel Burgin was chosen by the Local Republican chair to replace him on the ballot. This brought an outcry from some State leadership but nevertheless Rachel Burgin continued her race and won. On November 19, 2008, in Tallahassee Florida Rachel Burgin was sworn into office the second youngest single female to be elected to that position in Florida history.

Election history
August 31, 2004 (Republican Primary) Florida House District 56:  Deven Wanda Carty [13.6%], Lisa DeVitto [21.4%], Tim Mimbs [1.3%], Frank Shannon [15.3%], Chris Tompkins [16.2%], Trey Traviesa [32.2%].

November 2, 2004 (General Election) Florida House District 56: Neil Cosentino (Write in Candidate) [0.6%], Trey Traviesa (Republican) [72.1%], No Vote Cast for Position [27.3%]

November 7, 2006 (General Election) Florida House District 56: Trey Traviesa (Republican) [58%], Lee Nelson (Democrat) [42%]

August 12, 2008 Trey Traviesa announces that he will no longer serve in the Florida House.

August 16, 2008 Rachel Burgin, former Aid to Trey Traviesa is picked to replace him on the Republican Ballot.

November 4, 2008 Rachel Burgin wins house seat 59% over opponent Lewis Lariccia 39%.

November 19, 2008 Rachel Burgin is sworn into the Florida House of Representatives.

References

External links
 Florida House of Representatives - Trey Traviesa
 Trey Traviesa's web site
 Hillsborough County Supervisor of Elections

Florida State University alumni
McCombs School of Business alumni
Members of the Florida House of Representatives
Living people
Place of birth missing (living people)
1969 births